I'm Hungry may refer to:

 "I'm Hungry" (Roseanne), a 1990 television episode
 I'm Hungry!, a children's book by Rod Campbell
 "I'm Hungry", a song by Alice Cooper from Along Came a Spider, 2008
 "I'm Hungry", a song by Cassidy from Split Personality, 2004
 "I'm Hungry", a song by the Frogs from My Daughter the Broad, 1996
 "I'm Hungry", a song by Kottonmouth Kings from Joint Venture, 2005

See also
 J'ai faim !!! (lit. I'm hungry !!!), a 2001 French comedy film